Insurance Brokers Association of India (I.B.A.I.) was established as a company under Section 25 of the Companies Act, 1956 on 25 July 2001. All licensed insurance brokers must be members of the IBAI Insurance Broker Regulations. 
Insurance Brokers Association of India (IBAI) is the sole representative body of licenesed insurance brokers recognised by the Insurance Regulatory and Development Authority of India (IRDAI). As per the Insurance Brokers’ Regulations 2002 framed by the IRDAI and as amended from time to time (last amended in 2018) it is mandatory for all licensed Brokers  to be member of IBAI.  
The member strength of IBAI is 523 as of May-2022. The main objectives of IBAI is to encourage, promote interaction, facilitate and protect the interests of the members.
IBAI provides an avenue to the members for further education, training and research in all fields of insurance and reinsurance and represent the interests of Brokers with other Industry trade bodies.(Regional and National Level) IBAI is a member of  Council of Asia Pacific Brokers Association (CAPIBA), the Bombay Chamber of Commerce & Industry, Federation of Indian Chambers of Commerce & Industry (FICCI)

History 

Insurance Brokers Association of India (IBAI) was incorporated as a company under Section 25 of the Companies Act, 1956 vide Certificate of Incorporation No. U 67120 MH 2001 NPL 132860 dated 25 July 2001 with its own  Memorandum of Association as well as Articles of Association, as required under the Companies Act, 1956. The management of the IBAI vests in its board of directors (17 in number) who are elected by the members. The day-to-day functioning is entrusted by the board to those directors who are chosen as office-bearers & the Secretary-General who is appointed by the board.

Voice of insurance brokers 

 Besides active participation in regulatory mechanisms, IBAI provides as a forum for voice of insurance brokers.
 IBAI has been accredited to publishing the first ever policy holders handbook, which ensures no unfair means are resorted either by brokers or by policy holders

References

Insurance in India
Insurance industry organizations
Trade associations based in India
Organizations established in 2001
2001 establishments in India